Thomas N. Rabe (born February 18, 1951 in Heidelberg) is a German professor for gynaecology and obstetrics at the University Hospital Heidelberg. He is author of several scientific publications and reference books.

Biography 
Rabe earned his medical degree in Heidelberg. Since 1983 he has been a specialist in gynaecology and obstetrics. His research was focused on the steroid metabolism of the placenta, new methods of family planning, hormone therapy, and the development of computer-based teaching systems. After his professorship for gynaecology and obstetrics in 1991, he became attending physician at the university hospital and at the department for gynaecology, endocrinology, and fertility issues.

Between 1995 and 1999 Rabe was responsible for the scientific activities of the Collaborating Centres WHO (Genf) at the university's hospital for women. He also belongs to the editorial staff of several national and international trade journals.

Rabe is the grandson of John Rabe and advocates coming to terms with the history between China and Japan. With the support of his family he founded the "John Rabe Communication Centre", which is dedicated to continue his grandfather John Rabe's vision of peace.

In addition to his international contacts with various clinics and hospitals, Rabe is also member of the International Council at the Austrian Service Abroad.

Awards 

 1996: honorary degree of the Semmelweis University, Budapest, Hungary;
 1997: honorary degree of the Victor Babeș University of Medicine and Pharmacy, Timișoara, Romania;
 1999: honorary degree, University Women's’ Hospital, Cluj-Napoca, Romania;
 2002: honorary title at the Carol Davila University of Medicine and Pharmacy in Bucharest, Romania.

Publications (selection) 
 Rabe T, Strowitzki T, Diedrich K (eds.) (2000). Manual on Assisted Reproduction. 2nd updated Edition. Springer Verlag Berlin, Heidelberg, New York.
 Rabe T, Runnebaum, Benno (1999) Fertility control - update and trends. Springer, Heidelberg.  
 Rabe T, Runnebaum B (eds) (1998). Fertility Control Springer, Heidelberg.
 Rabe T, Diedrich K, Runnebaum B (Eds) (1997). Assisted Reproduction - a manual. Springer-Verlag, Heidelberg  
 Runnebaum B, Rabe T, Kiesel L (1985). Future aspects in contraception: Part 1: Male contraception. MTP Press Limited, Falcon House, Lancaster, England
 Runnebaum B, Rabe T, Kiesel L (Eds.) (1991). Female contraception and male fertility regulation. Parthenon Publishing Group, Casterton Hall, Carnforth, Lancaster, England

References 

German medical researchers
Physicians from Heidelberg
German gynaecologists
1951 births
Living people